Ghost Fever is a 1987 horror-comedy film directed by Lee Madden and written by Oscar Brodney. The film stars Sherman Hemsley, Luis Ávalos, Jennifer Rhodes, Deborah Benson, Diana Brookes and Myron Healey. The film was released on March 27, 1987, by Miramax Films.

It is an international co-production between the United States and Mexico. The plot concerns detectives Buford and Benny being sent to a haunted house. During the night they spend there, the duo encounter ghosts, vampires and zombies.

Plot
Buford (Sherman Hemsley) and Benny (Luis Ávalos) are two Greendale County, Georgia police officers sent to serve an eviction notice for an historic plantation. Two ghosts named Andrew Lee (Myron Healey), a former owner of the plantation, and Jethro (also played by Hemsley), a former slave, decide to prevent their old home from being foreclosed upon.

While the two officers explore the mansion, Buford discovers a hidden laboratory that was formerly used to experiment upon and torture the plantation slaves. Aggressive supernatural events begin occurring, but Lee and Jethro are confused because they are not responsible for these dangerous acts.

Buford and Benny then find the home's residents: two pretty sisters named Linda (Deborah Benson) and Lisa (Diana Brookes). The ladies explain that they believe their racist dead grandfather is the aggressive ghost. They introduce the men to Madame St. Esprit (Jennifer Rhodes), a spiritual medium who has been called upon to hold a séance. This leads to a supernatural attack involving lightning-like spirit energy.

During the evening and into the night, more ghostly mischief occurs. Jethro comes to realize that the slaves placed a voodoo curse upon their master and turned him into an immortal vampire. The vampire appears and the officers begin encountering zombies on the plantation grounds. Benny manages to kill the vampire by staking him through the heart.

Linda and Lisa reveal that they have been dead for many years and are tied to their house. To save the old plantation, Benny wins a boxing match (with a little help from Lee and Jethro) and uses the prize money to keep the home from going into foreclosure.

As Buford and Benny drive on a rural road at the night, Lee and Jethro kill the officers in a car crash. The ghosts of Buford and Benny happily return to the plantation to spend the after life with Linda and Lisa.

Cast 
Sherman Hemsley as Buford Washington / Jethro
Luis Ávalos as Benny Alvarez
Jennifer Rhodes as Madame St. Esprit
Deborah Benson as Linda
Diana Brookes as Lisa
Myron Healey as Andrew Lee
Joe Frazier as Terrible Tucker
Pepper Martin as Sheriff Clay/Beauregard Lee
Kenneth Johnston as Terrible Tucker's Manager
Roger Cudney as TV Announcer
Patrick Welch as Ring Announcer
Steve Stone as Reporter
Ramón Berumen as Referee
George Palmiero as Terrible Tucker's Trainer

Reception
Leonard Klady of the Los Angeles Times reviewed the film during its initial theatrical release in 1987. He declared the film to be "frighteningly bad," and noted "there's chemistry between actors Hemsley and Avalos but it's far from being of the sure-fire variety."

References

External links
 
 
 

1987 films
1980s English-language films
1980s comedy horror films
1980s fantasy comedy films
Miramax films
Films credited to Alan Smithee
American comedy horror films
American fantasy comedy films
American ghost films
Mexican fantasy comedy films
Mexican comedy horror films
Mexican ghost films
1987 comedy films
Films directed by Lee Madden
1980s American films
1980s Mexican films